Ismenias (Ancient Greek: Ἰσμηνίας) was an ancient Theban politician of the 4th century BC.  He rose to power in the years after the Peloponnesian War and pursued an anti-Spartan policy, which included harboring exiles fleeing the Thirty Tyrants in Athens. During a Spartan occupation of Thebes, he is identified, with Androcleides, as one of the leaders of the anti-Spartan faction and imprisoned. Plato names him as an example of someone who made a great amount of money in a short period of time, and includes him in a list of rich and powerful men with little moral fiber.

References

Further reading
Buck, Robert J. Thrasybulus and the Athenian Democracy: The Life of an Athenian Statesman.  Franz Steiner Verlag, 1998, 

Ancient Thebans
4th-century BC Greek people